Jase Coburn (born September 16, 1983) is an American basketball coach who is currently the head coach at Portland State University. He was promoted in 2021 after eight seasons as an assistant with the program, and was a coach at the high school and junior college ranks before joining Portland State.

Coaching career 
Coburn got his start coaching at Corona del Sol High School in Tempe as an assistant before moving on to Phoenix Junior College as an assistant. He was named the head coach at McClintock High School in Tempe at the age of 23 in 2007 and led them to a state championship by the time he was 26. He was also an assistant at Howard Junior College in Texas before joining Portland State.

Portland State 
Coburn was hired as an assistant coach at Portland State in 2013. He was elevated to associate head coach before the 2018 season.

Coburn was promoted to head coach in 2021 after Barret Peery left for an assistant position at Texas Tech.

Head coaching record

College

High school

References

External links 
 
 
 Portland State Vikings profile

1983 births
Living people
Sportspeople from Mesa, Arizona
Basketball coaches from Arizona
MiraCosta Spartans men's basketball players
High school basketball coaches in Arizona
Phoenix Bears men's basketball coaches
Howard Hawks men's basketball coaches
Portland State Vikings men's basketball coaches